Valdez Showers (born June 28, 1993) is an American football wide receiver who is currently a free agent. He was signed by the Washington Redskins as an undrafted free agent after the 2016 NFL Draft. He played college football at Florida.

Professional career

Washington Redskins
On May 6, 2016, Showers was signed by the Washington Redskins as an undrafted free agent. He was waived on August 27, 2016.

Indianapolis Colts
On August 9, 2017, Showers was signed by the Indianapolis Colts. He was waived on September 2, 2017.

References

External links
Florida Gators bio

1993 births
Living people
American football wide receivers
Florida Gators football players
Washington Redskins players
Indianapolis Colts players
Players of American football from Detroit